The Asia/Oceania Zone was one of three zones of regional competition in the 2018 Fed Cup.

Group I 
 Venue: R.K. Khanna Tennis Complex, New Delhi, India (hard)
 Date: 7–10 February

The eight teams were divided into two pools of four teams. The two pool winners took part in a play-off to determine the nation advancing to the World Group II play-offs. The four nations finishing last and second last in their pools took part in relegation play-offs, with the two losing nations being relegated to Group II for 2019.

Seeding

 1Fed Cup Rankings as of 13 November 2017

Pools

Play-offs

Final placements 

  was promoted to the 2018 Fed Cup World Group II play-offs.

Group II 
 Venue: Bahrain Polytechnic, Isa Town, Bahrain (hard)
 Date: 6–10 February

The fourteen teams were divided into two pools of four teams and two pools of three teams. The four pool winners took part in a play-off to determine the nations advancing to the World Group II play-offs.

Seeding

 1Fed Cup Rankings as of 13 November 2017

Pools

Play-offs

Final placements 

References 

 Fed Cup Result, 2018 Asia/Oceania Group I
 Fed Cup Result, 2018 Asia/Oceania Group II

External links 
 Fed Cup website

 
Asia/Oceania
Tennis tournaments in India
Tennis in Bahrain